Goniothalamus rhynchantherus is a species of plant in the Annonaceae family. It is native to  Kerala and Tamil Nadu in India. It is threatened by habitat loss.

References

rhynchantherus
Flora of Kerala
Flora of Tamil Nadu
Endangered plants
Taxonomy articles created by Polbot